The 1986 Orange Bowl was the 52nd edition of the college football bowl game, played at the Orange Bowl in Miami, Florida, on Wednesday, January 1. Part of the 1985–86 bowl game season, it matched the independent and top-ranked Penn State Nittany Lions and the #3 Oklahoma Sooners of the Big Eight Conference. Favored Oklahoma trailed early but won 25–10.

Teams

Penn State

The Nittany Lions won all eleven games, were the only undefeated team coming into this matchup and were ranked first in both polls, but were an underdog in this game. This was Penn State's first Orange Bowl appearance in twelve years.

Oklahoma

The #3 Sooners' sole loss was at home to Miami in mid-October. This was Oklahoma's second straight Orange Bowl appearance and their second straight Big Eight Conference title.

Game summary
The final game of a tripleheader on NBC, the game followed the Rose Bowl and kicked off shortly after 8 p.m. EST, at the same time as the Sugar Bowl on ABC, which matched second-ranked Miami and #8 Tennessee.

Tim Manoa gave Penn State an early lead on a short touchdown run and they led 7–0 after the first quarter. But Tim Lashar kicked three field goals and Keith Jackson caught a 71-yard touchdown pass from Jamelle Holieway as Oklahoma scored sixteen points in the second quarter while Massimo Manca gave the Nittany Lions their only points of the quarter with a late field goal to make it 16–10 at halftime.

Penn State was shut out from there, as Oklahoma's defense took over. Brian Bosworth had twelve tackles and the defense had a total of four interceptions. In the second half, Lashar kicked his third field goal, and Lydell Carr broke for a 61-yard touchdown run to seal the championship for the Sooners.

Kicker Lashar and defensive back Sonny Brown were named the game's most valuable players.

Statistics

Aftermath
The Sooners' championship became unanimous following #2 Miami's 35–7 loss to Tennessee in the Sugar Bowl, which was played at the same time. If the Hurricanes had won, the split national championship was probable as Miami was outranked by Oklahoma in the coaches poll and had soundly defeated the Sooners in Norman.

Penn State was in title contention again the following season, as they finished second in the polls. This time, a matchup between the #1 and #2 teams was able to be made and the Nittany Lions were scheduled to play #1 Miami for the national championship in the Fiesta Bowl, which they won.

References

Orange Bowl
Orange Bowl
Oklahoma Sooners football bowl games
Penn State Nittany Lions football bowl games
January 1986 sports events in the United States
Orange